Onibury is a civil parish in Shropshire, England.  It contains 25 listed buildings that are recorded in the National Heritage List for England.  Of these, two are at Grade II*, the middle of the three grades, and the others are at Grade II, the lowest grade.  The parish contains the village of Onibury and the surrounding countryside.  Most of the listed buildings are houses, cottages, farm houses and farm buildings, the earliest of which are timber framed.  The oldest building is a church, which is listed together with items in the churchyard.  In the parish are a country house and a mansion, both of which are listed, together with associated structures.  The other listed buildings include a gazebo, a former railway station, a war memorial, and a telephone kiosk.
 

Key

Buildings

References

Citations

Sources

Lists of buildings and structures in Shropshire